"The Box" is the 14th episode of the fifth season of the American television police sitcom series Brooklyn Nine-Nine, and the 104th overall episode of the series. The episode was written by Luke Del Tredici and directed by Claire Scanlon. It aired on Fox in the United States on April 1, 2018. The bottle episode features guest appearances from Sterling K. Brown and Romy Rosemont.

The show revolves around the fictitious 99th precinct of the New York Police Department in Brooklyn and the officers and detectives that work in the precinct. In the episode, Jake and Holt spend the night interrogating Phillip Davidson, a dentist who is accused of being the prime suspect behind his partner's death. The interrogation turns out to be more difficult than expected when Davidson manages to have excuses for everything.

According to Nielsen Media Research, the episode was seen by an estimated 1.78 million household viewers and gained a 0.8/3 ratings share among adults aged 18–49. The episode received acclaim from critics, who praised Samberg's, Braugher's and Brown's performances, the writing, tension and homage to Homicide: Life on the Street. For his performance in the episode, Sterling K. Brown was nominated for the Primetime Emmy Award for Outstanding Guest Actor in a Comedy Series.

Plot
Phillip Davidson (Sterling K. Brown), a successful dentist, is called to the precinct in order to be questioned about his business partner Robert Tupper's death, of which he is deemed the prime suspect. Jake Peralta (Andy Samberg) informs Raymond Holt (Andre Braugher) about the case, prompting Holt to cancel his plans in order to interrogate him.

The interrogation turns out to be even more difficult than expected. Davidson manages to hold off the accusations by having an alibi and having excuses for all the connections regarding his whereabouts when Tupper was killed. When Jake and Holt's various interrogation tactics repeatedly fail, Davidson manages to himself erode Jake's trust in Holt. Eventually, against Holt's request, Jake lies about a witness seeing Davidson at the scene of the crime (citing to Holt Frazier v. Cupp) but fails upon learning that the witness died long prior to Tupper's death. Davidson calls his lawyer (Romy Rosemont) in order to finally be released and Jake and Holt can only detain him for a few minutes more before they could file an assault report.

However, Jake finally comes up with the conclusion: Davidson was stealing meds from his partner's office when the partner found out and threatened to call the police. Jake says that Davidson bludgeoned him with a glass trophy and escaped to his uncle's cabin, constantly pointing out that he got lucky. This angers Davidson, who confesses that he killed his partner and had planned the perfect crime, and wasn't just an incapable amateur who just "got lucky". Jake and Holt eventually leave the precinct, only to see Boyle (Joe Lo Truglio), realizing that it is already morning, at which point they decide to "start" their work for the day.

Reception

Viewers
In its original American broadcast, "The Box" was seen by an estimated 1.78 million household viewers and gained a 0.8/3 ratings share among adults aged 18–49, according to Nielsen Media Research. This was slight decrease in viewership from the previous episode, which was watched by 1.83 million viewers with a 0.9/4 in the 18-49 demographics. This means that 0.8 percent of all households with televisions watched the episode, while 3 percent of all households watching television at that time watched it. With these ratings, Brooklyn Nine-Nine was the third highest rated show on FOX for the night, beating The Last Man on Earth, and Bob's Burgers but behind Family Guy and The Simpsons, fourth on its timeslot and tenth for the night, behind a rerun of Roseanne, Deception, Dateline NBC, NCIS: Los Angeles, Family Guy, The Simpsons, American Idol, and Jesus Christ Superstar Live in Concert.

Critical response

"The Box" received critical acclaim. LaToya Ferguson of The A.V. Club gave the episode an "A" grade and wrote, The Box' has such a simple but captivating premise, and its execution makes for an instantly rewatchable episode. Plus, Andy Samberg and especially Andre Braugher and Sterling K. Brown put on some damn good performances here. In fact, is it too soon to give Brown the Outstanding Guest Actor in a Comedy Emmy just for his scene saying the victim's name in different ways?" Daniel Kurland of Vulture wrote, The Box' gets far with a simple, but effective, structural approach to its interrogation. A lot of the first act has Jake and Raymond sequestered together as they formulate theories and bounce off of each other before they let Davidson into the equation. Holt is also eager to get his hands dirty again as he misses this aspect from his detective days, and Peralta knows an interrogation works better with two people so they can get some sort of Rush Hour/good cop, bad cop dynamic going on."

Steve Greene of IndieWire wrote, The Box' is a great example of what 'Brooklyn Nine-Nine' can do when it throws a wrench into its own rhythms. Jokes whizzing by at lightning speed (almost too fast to register Holt asking who Amy Adams is) require performers to cut straight to the punchline and not luxuriate in it too much. Even when Brown has to make those crazy faces in the rapid-fire back-and-forth, he gives it just enough of a difference to show that this is a character who enjoys acting almost as much as Brown seems to." Alan Sepinwall of Uproxx wrote, "Instead, 'The Box' turns out to be a very effective story about Jake once again seeking his boss's approval, and nearly blowing the case in the process. Because the interrogation has to feel real on some level, it's a bit lighter on jokes than your average episode, but still has plenty of humor both silly (Peralta's obnoxious song) and dry (Holt explaining that Jake pretending to be angry is 'like being yelled at by a children's cereal mascot') building up to the moment where Jake solves the puzzle by figuring out how to turn the bad guy's arrogance against him, until Holt drops his usual reserve to let out three consecutive 'Oh, damn!'s." Caroline Framke of Vox wrote, "This sounds easy enough, but make no mistake: The timing of each of these moments is very carefully chosen, by Scanlon during shooting and by Reuben after. Every decision of exactly when to move from one scene or joke to the next is a crucial one, and with 'The Box,' Reuben rose spectacularly to the occasion."

References

External links
 

2018 American television episodes
Bottle television episodes
Brooklyn Nine-Nine (season 5) episodes